Richard Drew may refer to:
 Richard Gurley Drew (1899–1980), inventor
 Richard Drew (photographer) (born 1946), AP photographer
 Richard Maxwell Drew (1822–1850), attorney and politician in Louisiana
 R. Harmon Drew Sr. (1917–1995), judge in Louisiana
 Zacron (Richard Drew, 1943–2012), English artist best known for designing the Led Zeppelin III album cover

See also
Charles R. Drew (Charles Richard Drew, 1904–1950), American physician, surgeon, and medical researcher